In commutative algebra, André–Quillen cohomology is a theory of cohomology for commutative rings which is closely related to the cotangent complex. It comes with a parallel homology theory called André–Quillen homology.

Motivation
Let A be a commutative ring, B be an A-algebra, and M be a B-module. The André–Quillen cohomology groups are the derived functors of the derivation functor DerA(B, M). Before the general definitions of André and Quillen, it was known for a long time that given morphisms of commutative rings  and a C-module M, there is a three-term exact sequence of derivation modules:

This term can be extended to a six-term exact sequence using the functor Exalcomm of extensions of commutative algebras and a nine-term exact sequence using the Lichtenbaum–Schlessinger functors. André–Quillen cohomology extends this exact sequence even further. In the zeroth degree, it is the module of derivations; in the first degree, it is Exalcomm; and in the second degree, it is the second degree Lichtenbaum–Schlessinger functor.

Definition
Let B be an A-algebra, and let M be a B-module. The qth André–Quillen cohomology group is:

Let  denote the relative cotangent complex of B over A. Then we have the formulas:

See also 

 Cotangent complex
 Deformation Theory
 Exalcomm

References

Generalizations 

 André–Quillen cohomology of commutative S-algebras
 Homology and Cohomology of E-infinity ring spectra

Commutative algebra
Homotopy theory
Cohomology theories